Dare County Regional Airport  is a public airport located one mile (2 km) northwest of the central business district (CBD) of Manteo, a town in Dare County, North Carolina, United States.

The airport offers a small museum chronicling the history of aviation on the Outer Banks. Exhibits include models of aircraft that played a part in the history of Dare County aviation, photos and displays about local aviator Dave Driskill, and the history of the airport.

The airport is adjacent to the North Carolina Aquarium on Roanoke Island.

Although most U.S. airports use the same three-letter location identifier for the FAA and IATA, Dare County Regional Airport is assigned MQI by the FAA and MEO by the IATA (which assigned MQI to Quincy, Massachusetts). The airport's ICAO identifier is KMQI.

FedEx Feeder is operated at the field by Mountain Air Cargo.

History 
Since the early 1940s Dare County has been served by a small private airport.  A public airport was under construction at the time of the Attack on Pearl Harbor, which prompted the U.S. Navy to abandon its plans to construct a Naval Auxiliary Air Station at Cape Hatteras, and instead focus on this airport, on Roanoke Island, which had a similar runway configuration.  The Naval Auxiliary Air Station Manteo (NAAS Manteo) was completed by the Navy and commissioned on March 3, 1943.  NAAS Manteo was shared by the Civil Air Patrol and the U.S. Navy.  As a naval air installation, NAAS Manteo and was used for special training of squadrons of F4F Wildcats, F6F Hellcats, SB2C Helldivers, TBM and TBF Avengers, PBY Catalinas and F4U Corsairs.  The Navy and the U.S. Coast Guard conducted anti-submarine patrols from the airfield until the field was placed in caretaker status December 15, 1945.  In 1947, NAAS Manteo was disestablished and control of the airfield was returned to Dare County.  In 1983, it was taken over by the Dare County Airport Authority.

Airlines and destinations

Cargo

References

External links 
 
 Dare County Regional Airport Museum
  at North Carolina DOT airport guide
 
 

Airports in North Carolina
Buildings and structures in Dare County, North Carolina
Transportation in Dare County, North Carolina
Museums in Dare County, North Carolina
Aerospace museums in North Carolina
Roanoke Island

Closed installations of the United States Navy